Sergei Yevgenyevich Berezin (born November 5, 1971) is a former NHL player from 1996–97 through 2002–03. Berezin, who played left wing in the NHL, was selected by the Toronto Maple Leafs in the tenth round (#256 overall) of the 1994 NHL Entry Draft. He played with the Leafs until being traded to the Phoenix Coyotes in 2001. At the end of the season he was flipped to the Montreal Canadiens where he scored their 10,000th goal on home ice. In the offseason he was traded to the Chicago Blackhawks before being sent to the Washington Capitals in a trade deadline day deal. He retired from the NHL and returned to Russia to play a final season before ending his career completely.

Playing career
From 1990–1994 Berezin played in Russia for Khimik Voskresensk where, in 1993–1994, he picked up 41 points in 40 games. He was selected in the 1994 NHL Entry Draft in the 10th round, 256th overall by the Toronto Maple Leafs. After being selected, Berezin played in the Deutsche Eishockey Liga (DEL) for the Kölner Haie (Cologne Sharks) where he registered 137 total points in 88 games played. 

In his first season in the NHL (1996–97) Berezin scored 25 goals and had 41 points in 73 games. This production was enough to earn a spot on the NHL All-Rookie Team. His best NHL season was in 1998–99 when he scored 37 goals and 59 points. After the 2000–01 season Berezin was traded from Toronto to the Phoenix Coyotes for Mikael Renberg. He was considered speedy and great in the offensive zone but not great defensively. He was known for losing his helmet during play, once losing his helmet on every single shift in a November 1996 game.

Over the next two seasons, Berezin would play for four different NHL franchises. In the 2001–02 season Berezin was traded by the Coyotes to the Montreal Canadiens for Brian Savage and a third round draft pick. While playing in a home game for the Canadiens, Berezin scored the franchise's 10,000th home goal. He ended the season with 11 goals and 26 points in 70 games. In the off-season Montreal traded him to the Chicago Blackhawks for a fourth round draft choice. At the trade deadline during the 2002–03 season he was shipped by the Blackhawks to the Washington Capitals for a fourth round draft choice, finishing the year with the Capitals. He retired from the NHL in 2003 and returned to Russia to play a single season with CSKA Moscow. He finished his career in the NHL with 502 games played while registering 286 points.

Personal life
Berezin resided in Florida following his retirement from hockey.

Career statistics

Regular season and playoffs

International

References

External links
 

1971 births
Living people
Chicago Blackhawks players
HC CSKA Moscow players
HC Khimik Voskresensk players
Ice hockey players at the 1994 Winter Olympics
Kölner Haie players
Montreal Canadiens players
Olympic ice hockey players of Russia
People from Voskresensk
Phoenix Coyotes players
Russian expatriate ice hockey people
Russian expatriate sportspeople in Canada
Russian expatriate sportspeople in Germany
Russian expatriate sportspeople in the United States
Russian ice hockey left wingers
Toronto Maple Leafs draft picks
Toronto Maple Leafs players
Washington Capitals players
Sportspeople from Moscow Oblast